"For The Lonely" is the second single by Sweetbox from the album Classified, with Jade Villalon as a frontwoman. The song is based on a theme from "La Califfa" by Ennio Morricone.

One of its remixes can be found on the compilation albums Best of Sweetbox (2005), The Greatest Hits (2005), another remix that is found on the single can also be found on the remix albums Best of 12" Collection (2006) & Best of Remix 1995-2006 (2006), and on Complete Best (2008). Another remix from the single can be found on the 4th disc (digital download version) of Greatest Hits (2007), as well as some newer remixes never before released.  A remix titled "For The Lonely (Dub's Lonely Dub)" can be found on the album Sweet Reggae Mix (2008), and lastly, a demo version can be found on the albums Raw Treasures Volume 1 (2005) and Rare Tracks (2008).

Track listing

Charts

References

Sweetbox songs
2001 singles
2000 songs
Songs written by Jade Villalon
RCA Records singles